Sant'Oreste is a comune (municipality) in the Metropolitan City of Rome in the Italian region Lazio, located about  north of Rome. It faces the Monte Soratte, that latter has a natural preserve with the same name.

History
The first mention of Sant'Oreste is made by Benedict of Soracte in his Chronicon in 747 AD, in which he mentions Curtis Sancti Heristi.  One source states that the toponym derives from the family of the Aristi or Edisti.  A member of this family, Saint Orestes (Edistus, Sant'Edisto, Sant'Oreste) was martyred for his faith around 68 AD.  Linguistic corruptions transformed the name from Sanctus Edistus to Sanctus Heristus, Santo Resto, San Tresto, Sant'Oreste.

References

Cities and towns in Lazio